Outey I (1672–1696), also known as Udayaraja II or Narai Ramathipadi II, born Ang Yong, was the Cambodian king reigned from 1695 to 1696. 

Outey I was a son of Kaev Hua II. He succeeded the king after his uncle Chey Chettha IV's first abdication. He reigned only ten months, died suddenly. Chey Chettha IV then regained power.

References

 Achille Dauphin-Meunier Histoire du Cambodge P.U.F Paris 1968.

1672 births
1696 deaths
17th-century Cambodian monarchs